

Key

Coaches
Note: Statistics are correct through the end of the 2021–22 P. League+ season.

References